Peter Adolf Augustus Berle (December 8, 1937 – November 1, 2007) was a lawyer, conservationist and member of the New York Assembly.

Early life
Berle was born on December 8, 1937 in New York City to Adolf Augustus Berle, Jr. (1895–1971) and Dr. Beatrice (née Bishop) Berle (1902–1993).  His father was an important member of U.S. President Franklin Roosevelt's "Brain Trust" and served as Assistant Secretary of State and U.S. Ambassador to Brazil. His mother was a prominent physician and author.  He had two sisters, Beatrice Van Cortlandt Berle and Alice Bishop Berle.

His maternal grandparents were Cortlandt Field Bishop and the former Amy Bend.  His great-grandfather was George Hoffman Bend, a member of the New York Stock Exchange who was prominent in New York Society.  His paternal grandparents were Mary Augusta (née Wright) and Adolf Augustus Berle.

Berle graduated from Harvard University and Harvard Law School.  After his father's death in 1971, his mother married Dr. André Frédéric Cournand, a physician who was awarded the Nobel Prize for medicine in 1956.

Career
After graduating from Harvard, Berle joined the United States Air Force where he trained as a parachutist and intelligence officer.  After being honorably discharged with the rank of first lieutenant, he returned to Cambridge for law school.  After graduating from law school, he joined the prestigious law firm of Paul, Weiss, Rifkind and Garrison, where he was assigned to case litigating against Consolidated Edison. Con Ed planned on building a pump storage facility on a hillside overlooking the Hudson River but Berle and the firm won a precedent-setting victory that forced the company to fix any environmental damage.

Short after in 1971, he founded Berle, Butzel & Kass, one of the first environmental law firms in the country.  His firm successfully litigated against Union Carbide for fouling underground water on Long Island.

New York State Assembly
In 1968, Berle was elected to the New York State Assembly serving three consecutive terms in the 178th, 179th and 180th New York State Legislatures from January 1, 1969 to December 31, 1974 on the Democrat / Liberal tickets.  His district, known as a Silk-Stocking District, extended from 60th Street to 125th Street.

As a freshman legislator, he successfully sued then-Gov. Nelson Rockefeller over budgetary process issues.  He played an important role in expanding Adirondack State Park by more than 9,000 acres in the park, including 11 of the highest peaks in the Adirondacks.   He eventually became the ranking member of the Committee on Environmental Conservation.  During his time in office, he wrote the book "Does the Citizen Stand a Chance?" advocating for the rights of underprivileged constituents, published in 1974.

N.Y.S. Department of Environmental Conservation
In May 1976, Berle was appointed by Gov. Hugh Carey to succeed Ogden R. Reid as Commissioner of the New York State Department of Environmental Conservation.  In this role, he helped initiate the cleanup of the Love Canal toxic waste dump at Niagara Falls.  During his tenure, action was taken against the General Electric Company for discharge of PCBs into the Hudson River and his office was responsible for readying and running the venues at the 1980 Winter Olympics in Lake Placid.

Berle, who was known as "fiercely independent," was forced to resign on December 12, 1978 after several disagreements with Gov. Carey.  He was succeeded by Robert F. Flacke, who was previously the chairman of the Adirondack Park Agency.

National Audubon Society
From 1985 to 1995, he served as president of the National Audubon Society, succeeding Russell W. Peterson, the former Governor of Delaware.  Concurrently, he was the president of the Stockbridge Land Trust, director of the Orion Society and a trustee and former chairman of the Century Foundation.

As president, he worked to prevent oil drilling in the Arctic National Wildlife Refuge as well as arguing before the Supreme Court in support of responsible handling of water issues in the Midwest.

Joint Public Advisory Committee
In 1993, he was one of the five U.S. members appointed by President William J. Clinton to the Joint Public Advisory Committee, a constituent piece of the Commission on Environmental Cooperation under the North American Free Trade Agreement, serving until 2002.

Personal life
In 1960, Berle married Lila Sloane Wilde in Lenox, Massachusetts. She was the daughter of Helm George Wilde (1907–1998) and Marjorie Lila Field (1910–1997), herself a granddaughter of Emily Vanderbilt Sloane (1874–1970). Lila's maternal uncle was Frederick Vanderbilt Field (1905–2000).  Peter and Lila were the parents of:

 Dolf A. Berle, the former president of Lucky Strike Entertainment and Dave & Busters.
 Mary A. Berle, former principal of Muddy Brook Elementary School in Great Barrington, MA.
 Beatrice L. Berle, who runs Berle Farm an organic farm in Hoosick, New York
 Robert T. Berle, a real estate investor.

Berle died on November 1, 2007 in Pittsfield, Massachusetts of injuries sustained in August 2007 in Stockbridge when the roof of a barn collapsed as he was dismantling it. His funeral was held at St. Paul's Episcopal Church in Stockbridge.

Residences
In 1998, Berle's wife inherited Elm Court, the historic Vanderbilt estate in Lenox, Massachusetts.

References

Further reading
 Does the Citizen Stand a Chance? the Politics of a State Legislature: New York (Politics in Government Series) (1974)

1937 births
2007 deaths
20th-century American lawyers
Harvard Law School alumni
Members of the New York State Assembly
Paul, Weiss, Rifkind, Wharton & Garrison people
20th-century American politicians